Podlaskie cuisine is an umbrella term for all dishes with a specific regional identity belonging to the region of Podlaskie. It is a subtype of Polish, Lithuanian and Belarusian cuisine with many similarities to and signs of the influence of neighbouring cuisines.

List of Podlaskie dishes

Pastry and baked goods

Augustowska jagodzianka - bread rolls with berry filling, besprinkled with streusel
Cebulniaczki - small bread rolls with onion stuffing
Hajnowski marcinek - cake prepared from a layer of 30 pancakes, with butter cream between each layer
Kreple - traditional doughnuts from East Prussia
Makowiec z Ejszeryszek - light buttery, sour tasting makowiec
Mrowisko - faworki-shaped cake; pastry lightness dependent on eggs, natural honey
Sękacz, bankuchen - pyramid cake, made of many layers; includes butter, egg whites, flour and cream; different variations exist around Podlasie

Soups

Chołodziec litewski - cold soup made with soured milk, young beet leaves, beets, cucumbers and chopped fresh dill

Stews, vegetable and potato dishes
Babka ziemniaczana - potato cake
Bliny po litewsku - flat, oval potato pancakes with meat filling
Cepeliny, kartacze sejneńskie - elongated, oval potato dumplings stuffed with meat and marjoram  
Kociołek cygański - thick-textured soup with chicken, pork, kiełbasa with added mushrooms and vegetables
Kopytka - potato dumplings with fried onions 
Kołduny litewskie - a type of small pierogi, stuffed with meat, besprinkled with pork rind and onion 
Pieczeń wiedźmy - roast with pork ham, slices of fatback, onions and bay leaves
Pierekaczewnik - an oval, curled pasty; taste dependent on filling
Pierogi ruskie (Ruthenian pierogi) - quark cheese and potato dumplings
Pierogi wigierskie - crescent-shaped pierogi with fruit stuffing
Tort ziemniaczany - roast with Krakowska kiełbasa, cheese and onion

Fish dishes
Okoń smażony - perch fried on butter

Pork and beef dishes
Kiszka ziemniaczana - kaszanka with pork, bacon or fatback

Puddings
Melszpejz zaparzany z jabłek - cake based on butter, apples and bread crumbs

See also
Lublin cuisine
Świętokrzyskie cuisine
Pomeranian cuisine
Polish cuisine
List of Polish dishes

References

Polish cuisine
Lithuanian cuisine
Belarusian cuisine
Podlaskie Voivodeship